The High Security prison Drenovë, or Drenovë Prison, in Drenovë, Korçë, is a prison located in Korçë, Albania.

References

Prisons in Albania
Buildings and structures in Korçë